The 2022 Union Budget of India was presented by the Minister of Finance  Nirmala Sitharaman on the 1st of February 2022, as her fourth budget. This is the third budget of Narendra Modi-led NDA government's second term. The Economic Survey for 2021–2022 was released on 31 January 2022, a day before the budget.

History 
The Union Budget is the annual financial report of India; an estimate of income and expenditure of the government on a periodical basis. As per Article 112 of the Indian Constitution, it is a compulsory task of the government. The first budget of India was presented on 18 February 1860 by Scotsman James Wilson. The first Union Budget of Independent India was presented by RK Shanmukham Chetty on 26 November 1947.

References 

Union budgets of India
Modi administration

Further reading
2021 Union budget of India